Kajunjumele is an administrative ward in the Kyela District of the Mbeya Region of Tanzania. In 2016 the Tanzania National Bureau of Statistics report there were 9,081 people in the ward, from 8,240 in 2012.

Villages / vitongoji 
The ward has 5 villages and 14 vitongoji.

 Buloma
 Buloma
 Kapugi
 Kiwira
 Kajunjumele
 Katyongoli
 Lusyembe
 Nganganyila
 Kandete
 Kilwa
 Lukwego
 Mpanda
 Njisi
 Kingila
 Bujesi
 Iponjola
 Lupaso
 Lupaso
 Malaka

References 

Wards of Mbeya Region